Mapleton is an unincorporated community in Lane County, Oregon, United States. It is also the western terminus of Oregon Route 36. As of the 2000 census, Mapleton had a total population of 918.

Demographics

History
Mapleton was likely named by Julia Ann "Grandma" Bean for the abundance of Bigleaf Maple trees in the area. Grandma Bean's husband was Obediah Roberts Bean, and their eldest child was judge Robert S. Bean. Pioneers of 1852, the Beans moved to the Mapleton area in 1886 and the town was named shortly thereafter. There was a post office called Seaton established north of the locality in 1885, and when it moved to the Mapleton area in 1889, Mrs. Bean became postmaster. The post office was renamed Mapleton to match the town in 1896.

Climate
This region experiences warm (but not hot) and dry summers.  According to the Köppen Climate Classification system, Mapleton has a warm-summer Mediterranean climate, abbreviated "Csb" on climate maps.

References

External links 
Mapleton School District

Unincorporated communities in Lane County, Oregon
1889 establishments in Oregon
Populated places established in 1889
Unincorporated communities in Oregon